The 1918 United States Senate election in Wyoming took place on November 5, 1918. Incumbent Republican Senator Francis E. Warren ran for re-election to his fifth consecutive term in the Senate, in his first popular election. He was opposed by former Governor John E. Osborne, the Democratic nominee, who had until recently served as the U.S. Assistant Secretary of State. Owing in part to Warren's long record of service, and also to the strong Republican performance throughout the country in the 1918 elections, Warren defeated Osborne by a wide margin.

Democratic primary

Candidates
 John E. Osborne, former Governor of Wyoming, former U.S. Assistant Secretary of State

Results

Republican Primary

Candidates
 Francis E. Warren, incumbent U.S. Senator

Results

General election

Results

References

Wyoming
1918
1918 Wyoming elections